Fujian Broncos Football Club is a Professional club from Quanzhou, China. They started competing in China League Two.

History
Quanzhou Broncos F.C. was established in 2013. On 6 March 2014, they changed their name to Fujian Broncos and enrolled in the 2014 China League Two. After playing there for two seasons, the club had to sell their Chinese FA registration and entire first-team to Jiangsu Yancheng Dingli F.C. After selling the first team, in 2017, the club played with a Team of 19–20-year-old players, and won the Quanzhou group of Fujian Super League, under the Portuguese coach Mauro Jerónimo. However, in the final stages of the league, the team was disqualified for disobedience to referees in their game against Fujian Tianxin.

Name history
2013–2014 Quanzhou Broncos F.C. 泉州超越
2014– Fujian Broncos F.C. 福建超越

Managerial history
  Zhang Yuning (2014)
  Wei Xin (2015)
  Mauro Jerónimo (2016–2017)

Results
All-time league rankings

As of the end of 2015 season.

 in South Group.

Key
 Pld = Played
 W = Games won
 D = Games drawn
 L = Games lost
 F = Goals for
 A = Goals against
 Pts = Points
 Pos = Final position

 DNQ = Did not qualify
 DNE = Did not enter
 NH = Not Held
 – = Does Not Exist
 R1 = Round 1
 R2 = Round 2
 R3 = Round 3
 R4 = Round 4

 F = Final
 SF = Semi-finals
 QF = Quarter-finals
 R16 = Round of 16
 Group = Group stage
 GS2 = Second Group stage
 QR1 = First Qualifying Round
 QR2 = Second Qualifying Round
 QR3 = Third Qualifying Round

References

Football clubs in China
Association football clubs established in 2013
2013 establishments in China
Jinjiang, Fujian
Sport in Quanzhou